Antoine Gambert (born 7 January 1959) is a French rowing coxswain. He competed in the men's coxed pair event at the 1976 Summer Olympics.

References

1959 births
Living people
French male rowers
Olympic rowers of France
Rowers at the 1976 Summer Olympics
Place of birth missing (living people)